The Chesterfield is a formal, dark, knee-length overcoat with a velvet collar introduced around the 1840s in the United Kingdom, with prominence attributed to its namesake George Stanhope, 6th Earl of Chesterfield, then a leader of British fashion.

The Chesterfield coat, with its heavy waist suppression using a waist seam, gradually replaced the over-frock coat during the second half of the 19th century as a choice for a formal overcoat, and survived as a coat of choice over the progression from frock coat everyday wear to the introduction of the lounge suit, but remained principally associated with formal morning dress and white tie.

A less formal derivation is the similar, but with alighter fabric, slightly shorter, top coat called covert coat.

Characteristics

The dark Chesterfield, which comes with a defining velvet collar has no horizontal seam or sidebodies, but can still be somewhat shaped using the side seams and darts. It can be single- or double-breasted, and has been popular in a wide variety of fabrics, typically heavier weight tweeds, or charcoal and navy, and even the camel hair classic, although such fabrics may be more associated with a more casual polo coat. These variations make it extremely versatile, so it can be worn with a city suit or even semiformal dress, as well as casual sports jackets.  It was a staple of smartly dressed men's wardrobes from the 1920s to 1960s, and has become a classic style for both men and even women.

Popular Culture
 Doctor Who features Chesterfield coats being worn by the Doctor during his eighth, eleventh, twelfth, and thirteenth incarnations.

See also 
 Frock coat

References

External links 
 

Coats (clothing)
Formal wear
History of clothing (Western fashion)